The Qajar Bathhouse (Persian: حمام قجر) is a historical bathhouse in Qazvin, Iran. It was built in 1647 in Safavid Iran by the order of the shah, and by Amingune Khan Qajar who was a Sardar of the Shah, and was initially known as the Shahi bathhouse.

It is approximately 1045 square meters large, and has two different sections for men and women.  It is now used as an anthropology museum, and is listed among the Iranian national heritage sites with the number 12601.

See also 

 Khan Bathhouse, Sanandaj

References 

Safavid architecture
Qazvin
17th-century establishments in Iran
National works of Iran
Public baths in Iran